This runestone, listed as U 13 in Rundata, crowns the barrow of Björn Ironside in Uppland, Sweden. The stone is a fragment; broken pieces of the stone lie next to it.

Inscription
A transliteration of the damaged runic inscription is:
... ...[r]kutr þaiʀ... / ... atu ' ok| |ku[þ]... ... 
(... ... Torgöt the... / ... spirit and Gods... ... )

Gallery

References

Uppland Runic Inscription 0013